Tristan Rogers (born 3 June 1946) is an Australian-American actor. He is best known for playing Robert Scorpio on the ABC soap opera General Hospital and for voicing Jake in Walt Disney Pictures' The Rescuers Down Under. He is currently starring as Robert Scorpio on General Hospital.

Rogers was born in Melbourne. His early acting roles were on Australian television and he completed short stints in soap operas Bellbird, Number 96 (in 1974) and The Box (in 1975). He was a regular in the police drama series The Link Men (1970) which lasted for 13 episodes, and had guest roles in programs including Barrier Reef, Division 4 and the 1976 miniseries Power Without Glory. He also appeared in a few British films in the early 1970s, notably Four Dimensions of Greta (1972), The Flesh and Blood Show (1972) and Sex Farm (1973).

United States roles

General Hospital
He originally appeared on General Hospital from December 1980 until February 1992. The popularity and longevity of the character Robert Scorpio in General Hospital came as a result of his involvement with the monumentally popular "supercouple" Luke and Laura, whose 1981 wedding brought in 30 million viewers and remains the highest-rated hour in American soap opera history.

While Rogers' Scorpio had been "killed with no body found" when he left the series in 1992, Rogers returned briefly in 1995 as Scorpio's spirit to comfort the character's daughter Robin Scorpio (Kimberly McCullough), who is dealing with the loss of her boyfriend to an AIDS-related illness and is herself HIV-positive. He returned again in January 2006 for six weeks, this time with Scorpio being very much alive. Rogers reappeared in April 2006 and left again that November.

From 5 August 2008 through 21 October 2008, Rogers reprised the role of Robert Scorpio on the second season of SOAPnet's General Hospital: Night Shift, a prime time spin-off of General Hospital which stars Scorpio's daughter Robin. He was featured in 12 of the season's 14 episodes, and Soap Opera Digest named the appearance their "Best Return" of 2008. Rogers later reappeared on General Hospital for four episodes starting 22 December 2008 as Scorpio attends Robin's wedding.

Rogers returned to General Hospital as Robert Scorpio on 29 February 2012 after Anna Devane (Finola Hughes) called him back to Port Charles to tell him that their daughter Robin Scorpio-Drake had been killed in a lab accident. After seven episodes, he left again on 8 March 2012. Rogers expressed disappointment. He later returned to the series on 15 November 2012 but later departed on 18 December 2012 as his character was drugged into a coma. Rogers reprised the role on 4 October 2013 as part of his on-screen daughter's return. However, on 14 November 2013 it was announced that he would be departing the series to return to The Young and the Restless as Colin Atkinson. He made his last appearance on 30 January 2014.

Rogers returned to the series as Robert Scorpio on 17 December 2015 but he was also portraying Colin on Y&R at the same time. He later left the series on 2 February 2016, although he briefly returned from 26 August to 9 September in the same year.

Rogers returned to General Hospital in April 2018 for a story arc in which he aids Anna Devane who is trying to locate her long lost son Henrik Faison. Henrik is the unknown child that she bore in secret with the late Cesar Faison. After leaving the show on 1 June 2018, he later returned yet again from 27 July to 12 September in the same year for another story arc where Anna and Finn go missing. In 2019, he returned to the show again on 25 January and has remained on the show since then on a recurring basis.

The Young and the Restless
Rogers returned to daytime television on 8 December 2010 when he joined the cast of The Young and the Restless as Colin Atkinson. He was placed on contract with the show in February 2011. However, Rogers' character was written out of the series in October 2011. He returned to the role briefly in 2012.

Other roles

Rogers starred in the CINE award-winning short Opportunity Knocks, portraying Death himself. Co-produced by Aaron Wells and Suzanne Niedland, there are plans to develop the short into a feature-length film. 

In 1994 Rogers guest-starred in season one, episode "The War Prayer", of the science fiction TV series Babylon 5. He has done voice-over work representing restaurant chain Outback Steakhouse, Foster's Lager, Reebok, Epson and others.

He voiced Jake the kangaroo mouse in The Rescuers Down Under, and gave his voice to the 2015 video game, Mad Max.

From 1997 to 1998, Rogers played bar owner Harry in Fast Track, a series about stock car racing which was filmed in Canada. 

Since 2010, Rogers has starred on the soap opera web series The Bay as Lex Martin.

In 2019 he played Doc in the Amazon series, Studio City. In 2020 that role garnered him an Emmy for Outstanding Performance by a Supporting Actor in a Digital Drama Series at the 47th Annual Daytime Emmy Awards.

Personal life
Rogers has been married to Teresa Parkerson since 21 May 1995. They have two children: daughter Sara Jane (born 25 August 1992) and son Cale (August, 1996). He bought a home in Palm Springs, California, in 1997. He was formerly married to Barbara Meale from 7 June 1974 until 1984 when they divorced.

Filmography
 Four Dimensions of Greta (1972) – Hans Wiemer
 The Flesh and Blood Show (1972) – Tony Weller
 Sex Farm (1973) – Robert Waitman
 The Rescuers Down Under (1990) – Jake (voice)
 Soulmates (1992) – Richard Wayborn
 Night Eyes 3 (1993) – Jim Stanton
 A Piece of Eden (2000) – Victor Hardwick
 Delgo (2008) – Nohrin Officer (voice)
 Jack Rio (2008) – Morton the Gallery Owner
 Raven (2010) – Ancient Priest
 The Los Angeles Ripper (2011) – Singing Class Member

References

External links
 

1946 births
Living people
Male actors from Melbourne
American male soap opera actors
American male voice actors
Male actors from Palm Springs, California
Australian emigrants to the United States
Australian male television actors
Australian male voice actors
Daytime Emmy Award winners
People with acquired American citizenship